Canthon vigilans, the vigilant dung beetle, is a species in the family Scarabaeidae. It is found in North America.

References

Further reading

External links

 

Deltochilini
Articles created by Qbugbot
Beetles described in 1858